Abe Burrows' Almanac is an American television series that aired on CBS from January 4, 1950, until March 29, 1950.

The live program, hosted by Abe Burrows, featured music, song and comedy performances by guests.  The show was broadcast on Wednesday evenings, 9-9:30 p.m. Eastern Time. Milton DeLugg conducted the orchestra.

While Burrows had a successful nightclub act and made regular appearances as a performer on CBS radio programs, this short-lived series is notable for being his only featured role in a television program.

References

External links
 
 

1950 American television series debuts
1950 American television series endings
1950s American variety television series
American live television series
English-language television shows
Black-and-white American television shows
CBS original programming